Jørgen Herman Vogt (21 July 1784  – 12 January 1862) was a Norwegian politician who served as First Minister of Norway from 1856 to 1858, during the personal union between Sweden and Norway. The first minister was subordinated to the governor and the viceroy in the political hierarchy, but for two periods when no governor or viceroy was present, he served as a de facto prime minister of Norway.

Vogt was born  in the Bragernes neighborhood of Drammen  in Buskerud, Norway. He was the son of timber merchant Niels Nielsen Vogt (1755-1809) and Abigael Monrad (1759-1812). Vogt was brought up as one of 13 siblings in Kongsberg. He entered the University of Copenhagen in 1800 and earned his law degree  in 1806. Vogt succeeded his father was district stipendiary magistrate of Nordfjord in 1809.

He became a member of the finance committee of the Norwegian Constituent Assembly at Eidsvoll in 1814. In 1822, Vogt was appointed state secretary and chief of the central government office in Christiania (now Oslo). In  1825, he was  appointed councillor of state and chief of the Ministry of the Army. When First Minister Nicolai Krog resigned in January 1855, Vogt succeeded him. Vogt resigned the position in December 1858.

References

1784 births
1862 deaths
Politicians from Drammen 
People from Kongsberg
19th-century Norwegian politicians
Ministers of Finance of Norway
University of Copenhagen alumni
Burials at Old Aker Cemetery
Ministers of Justice of Norway
Ministers of Education of Norway